The Europe/Africa Zone was one of the three zones of the regional Davis Cup competition in 1995.

In the Europe/Africa Zone there were three different tiers, called groups, in which teams competed against each other to advance to the upper tier. Winners in Group II advanced to the Europe/Africa Zone Group I. Teams who lost their respective ties competed in the relegation play-offs, with winning teams remaining in Group II, whereas teams who lost their play-offs were relegated to the Europe/Africa Zone Group III in 1996.

Participating nations

Draw

 and  promoted to Group I in 1996.

First round

Lithuania vs. Luxembourg

Nigeria vs. Poland

Ghana vs. Ireland

Ivory Coast vs. Finland

Belarus vs. Ukraine

Estonia vs. Latvia

Egypt vs. Monaco

Slovakia vs. Great Britain

Second round

Luxembourg vs. Nigeria

Finland vs. Ghana

Latvia vs. Ukraine

Egypt vs. Slovakia

Relegation play-offs

Lithuania vs. Poland

Ivory Coast vs. Ireland

Belarus vs. Estonia

Great Britain vs. Monaco

Third round

Finland vs. Luxembourg

Egypt vs. Ukraine

References

External links
Davis Cup official website

Davis Cup Europe/Africa Zone
Europe Africa Zone Group II